A list of British films released in 1941.

See also
 1941 in British music
 1941 in British television
 1941 in the United Kingdom

External links
 

1941
Films
Lists of 1941 films by country or language
1940s in British cinema